Black Tower is a fort of Braşov, Romania  

The tower located on a large rock on Warthe Hill. The purpose of the tower was to deny enemy soldiers access to the city walls, which, in this case, were no further than 5 meters (the pass was only widened in 1819–1820).

References

Fortifications of Brașov
Towers in Romania